The 2020 MLS SuperDraft was the 21st edition of the SuperDraft conducted by Major League Soccer. The 2020 SuperDraft was the first SuperDraft held exclusively via conference call and web streaming. The first two rounds of the 2020 SuperDraft were held on January 9, 2020 while rounds three and four were held on January 13, 2020. Previously, the SuperDraft had been held in conjunction with the annual January United Soccer Coaches convention.

Format
The SuperDraft format has remained constant throughout its history and closely resembles that of the NFL Draft:

Any expansion teams receive the first picks. MLS has announced that Inter Miami CF and Nashville SC would begin play as expansion teams in 2020. Inter Miami CF would select first, and Nashville SC second.
Non-playoff clubs receive the next picks in reverse order of prior season finish.
Teams that made the MLS Cup Playoffs are then ordered by which round of the playoffs they are eliminated.
The winners of the MLS Cup are given the last selection, and the losers the penultimate selection.

Player selection

Round 1

Round 2

Round 3

Round 4

Trades 
Round 1

Round 2

Round 3

Round 4

Notable undrafted players

Homegrown players

Players who signed outside of MLS 
This is a list of undrafted players who signed in leagues outside of MLS.

Summary

Selections by college athletic conference

Schools with multiple draft selections

References 

Major League Soccer drafts
SuperDraft
MLS SuperDraft